Tetradothrips is a genus of thrips in the family Phlaeothripidae.

Species
 Tetradothrips foliiperda

References

Phlaeothripidae
Thrips
Thrips genera